My Kitchen Rules NZ (series 2) is a reality television cooking programme which airs on the TVNZ TV2.

For 2015, TVNZ switched My Kitchen Rules NZ from TV One to TV2 and in the revamped series duos will go head-to-head with teams from other regions around New Zealand. It premiered on 12 October 2015 and ended on 15 December 2015. The winning team, Jess and Stella, won the $100,000 prize money.

Teams

Elimination history

Competition details

Instant restaurant round

Round 1 
 Episodes 1 to 5
 Airdate – 12 to 26 Oct 2015
 Description – Teams were to transform their homes into an 'Instant Restaurant', serving opposing teams and judges a three course meal (Entree, Main and Dessert). All teams are judged and scored by the other teams, and also by Ben and Gareth.

Round 2 
 Episodes 6 to 10
 Airdate – 27 Oct to 10 November 2015
 Description – Teams were to transform their homes into an 'Instant Restaurant', serving opposing teams and judges a three course meal (Entree, Main and Dessert). All teams are judged and scored by the other teams, and also by Ben and Gareth.

Sudden death – Round 3

People's choice 1: Oxfam BBQ challenge
 Episode 11
 Airdate – 16 November 2015
 Description – Two teams of gatecrashers join – Ben & Reagan and Jess & Stella. The teams head into the first challenge to serve a dish. The crowd will vote by donating for their favourite dish and the 2 teams who raise the most donations will receive People's Choice, sending both teams safe from Rapid Cook-Off and Showdown. Judges Ben and Gareth eliminate the weakest team and sent the second weakest team directly into the first Sudden Death Cook-Off. All other surviving teams are through to next showdown.

Rapid cook-off

45min magic box challenge by Nosh
 Episode 12 
 Airdate – 17 November 2015
 Description – Each box consist of a protein and two complementary ingredients. All teams are required to use all the ingredients in the box and make the protein the star of the dish.

Showdown – Catch of the day (Battle of the fishes) 
 Description – The teams are paired with the catch of the day, Gurnard or Trevally. The team which produces the best Gurnard and Trevally Dish will be safe from Sudden Death. The losing teams will compete in the Double Elimination Sudden Death.

Sudden death 
 Episode 13 
 Airdate – 23 November 2015
 Description – In a double elimination, the teams compete in the first sudden death cook-off.

Sudden death – Round 4

People's choice 2: Training day challenge
 Episode 14
 Airdate – 24 November 2015
 Description – The teams headed into the Ponsonby Rugby Club field for their second challenge. The players will vote for their favourite dish and the team with the highest votes will receive People's Choice, sending the team safe from both the Rapid Cook-Off and Showdown. Judges Ben and Gareth send the weakest team directly into the second Sudden Death Cook-Off. All other surviving teams are through to next showdown.

Kitchen cook off – TBD
 Episode 15
 Airdate – 30 November 2015
 Description – Meat eater and beer drinker paradise.  Rapid cook off: teams must cook one Entree and one main, using their given cuts of beef and lamb.  Bar snack: teams must cook one bar snack dish and twin this with a choice of one of four beers.

Sudden death 
 Episode 16 
 Airdate – 1 December 2015
 Description – In a second double elimination, the teams compete in the second sudden death cook-off.

Sudden death – Round 5

People's choice 3: School meal challenge
 Episode 17
 Airdate – 7 December 2015
 Description – The top five teams cook a five-course degustation dinner for students and guests at Auckland's Pakuranga College. The lowest scoring team is eliminated as the remaining four teams are ranked into the semifinals.  The Winners of the challenge are paired with the fourth placed team for the first Semi-final cook-off while the remaining two teams will be competing in the second Semi-final.

Semi-finals

Semi-final 1
 Episode 18
 Airdate – 8 December 2015
 Description – 2 Teams in the first Semi-Final Cook-Off. The lower scoring team is eliminated and the winner proceeds through to the Grand Final.

Semi-final 2 
 Episode 19 
 Airdate – 14 December 2015
 Description – 2 Teams in the second semi-final cook-off. The lower scoring team is eliminated and the other team becomes the second team to proceed into the grand final.

Grand-finals 
 Episode 20 
 Airdate – 15 December 2015
 Description – In the final cook-off for the series, the top two teams face-off in the ultimate grand final. Teams each cook a five course degustation in the format of a cold entree, hot entree, seafood main, meat main and dessert. 20 plates of each course, totalling 100 plates per team were served to all eliminated teams, friends and family. Guest judges returned for the final verdict of awarding the $100,000 prize to the winners. Teams also wear chef attire and have their Instant Restaurant represented.

Episodes

References

External links
 Official site

2015 New Zealand television seasons
My Kitchen Rules